Christopher Edward Nolan  (born 30 July 1970) is a British-American filmmaker. Known for his Hollywood blockbusters with complex storytelling, Nolan is considered a leading filmmaker of the 21st century. His films have grossed $5 billion worldwide. The recipient of many accolades, he has been nominated for five Academy Awards, five BAFTA Awards and six Golden Globe Awards. In 2015, he was listed as one of the 100 most influential people in the world by Time, and in 2019, he was appointed Commander of the Order of the British Empire for his contributions to film.

Nolan developed an interest in filmmaking from a young age. After studying English literature at University College London, he made several short films before his feature film debut with Following (1998). Nolan gained international recognition with his second film, Memento (2000), for which he was nominated for the Academy Award for Best Original Screenplay. He transitioned from independent to studio filmmaking with Insomnia (2002), and found further critical and commercial success with The Dark Knight Trilogy (2005–2012), The Prestige (2006) and Inception (2010); the last of these earned Nolan two Oscar nominations—Best Picture and Best Original Screenplay. This was followed by Interstellar (2014), Dunkirk (2017) and Tenet (2020). For Dunkirk, he earned two Academy Award nominations, including his first for Best Director.

Nolan's work regularly feature in the listings of best films of their respective decades. They are typically characterised by epistemology and existentialism. Infused with a metaphysical outlook, they explore ethics, the construction of time, and the malleable nature of memory and personal identity. His work is permeated with mathematically inspired images and concepts, unconventional narrative structures, practical special effects, experimental soundscapes, large-format film photography, and materialistic perspectives. He has co-written several of his films with his brother Jonathan, and runs the production company Syncopy Inc. with his wife Emma Thomas.

Early life 

Christopher Edward Nolan was born on 30 July 1970, in Westminster, London. His father, Brendan, was a British advertising executive who worked as a creative director. His mother, Christina, was an American flight attendant from Evanston, Illinois; she would later work as a teacher of English. He has an elder brother, Matthew, and a younger brother, Jonathan, also a filmmaker. The three were raised Catholic in London and would spend their summers in Evanston. Nolan has both UK and US citizenship.

Growing up, Nolan was particularly influenced by the work of Ridley Scott and the science fiction films 2001: A Space Odyssey (1968) and Star Wars (1977). He would repeatedly watch the latter film and extensively research its making. Nolan began making films at the age of seven, borrowing his father's Super8 camera and shooting short films with his action figures. These films included a stop motion animation homage to Star Wars called Space Wars. He cast his brother Jonathan and built sets from "clay, flour, egg boxes and toilet rolls". His uncle, who had worked at NASA building guidance systems for the Apollo rockets, sent him some launch footage: "I re-filmed them off the screen and cut them in, thinking no-one would notice", Nolan later remarked. From the age of 11, he aspired to be a professional filmmaker. Between 1981 and 1983, Nolan enrolled at Barrow Hills, a Catholic prep school in Weybridge, Surrey. In his teenage years, Nolan started making films with Adrien and Roko Belic. Nolan and Roko co–directed the surreal 8mm Tarantella (1989), which was shown on Image Union, an independent film and video showcase on the Public Broadcasting Service.

Nolan was educated at Haileybury and Imperial Service College, an independent school in Hertford Heath, Hertfordshire, and later studied English literature at University College London (UCL). Opting out of a traditional film education, he pursued "a degree in something unrelated", which his father suggested "gives a different take on things". He chose UCL specifically for its filmmaking facilities, which comprised a Steenbeck editing suite and 16mm film cameras. Nolan was president of the Union's Film Society, and with Emma Thomas (his girlfriend and future wife) he screened feature films of 35 mm during the school year and used the money earned to produce 16mm films over the summers.

Career

1993–2003: Early career and breakthrough 
After earning his bachelor's degree in English literature in 1993, Nolan worked as a script reader, camera operator and director of corporate videos and industrial films. He directed, wrote and edited the short film Larceny (1996), which was filmed over a weekend in black and white with limited equipment and a small cast and crew. Funded by Nolan and shot with the UCL Union Film society's equipment, it appeared at the Cambridge Film Festival in 1996 and is considered one of UCL's best shorts. For unknown reasons, the film has since been removed from public view. Nolan filmed a third short, Doodlebug (1997), about a man seemingly chasing an insect with his shoe, only to discover that it is a miniature of himself. Nolan and Thomas first attempted to make a feature in the mid-1990s with Larry Mahoney, which they scrapped. During this period in his career, Nolan had little to no success getting his projects off the ground, facing several rejections; he added, "[T]here's a very limited pool of finance in the UK. To be honest, it's a very clubby kind of place ... Never had any support whatsoever from the British film industry."

Shortly after abandoning Larry Mahoney, Nolan conceived the idea for his first feature, Following (1998), which he wrote, directed, photographed and edited. The film depicts an unemployed young writer (Jeremy Theobald) who trails strangers through London, hoping they will provide material for his first novel, but is drawn into a criminal underworld when he fails to keep his distance. It was inspired by Nolan's experience of living in London and having his apartment burgled; he observed that the common attribute between larceny and pursuing someone through a crowd was that they both cross social boundaries. Co-produced by Nolan with Thomas and Theobald, it was made on a budget of around £3,000. Most of the cast and crew were friends of the director, and shooting took place on weekends over the course of a year. To conserve film stock, each scene was rehearsed extensively to ensure that the first or second take could be used in the final edit. Following won several awards during its festival run and was well received by critics who labelled Nolan a majorly talented debutant. Scott Timberg of New Times LA wrote that it "echoed Hitchcock classics", but was "leaner and meaner". Janet Maslin of The New York Times was impressed with its "spare look" and "agile hand-held camerawork", saying, "As a result, the actors convincingly carry off the before, during and after modes that the film eventually, and artfully, weaves together."

Following success afforded Nolan the opportunity to make Memento (2000), which became his breakthrough film. His brother Jonathan pitched the idea to him, about a man with anterograde amnesia who uses notes and tattoos to hunt for his wife's murderer. Jonathan worked the idea into a short story, "Memento Mori" (2001), and Nolan developed it into a screenplay that told the story in reverse. Aaron Ryder, an executive for Newmarket Films, said it was "perhaps the most innovative script I had ever seen". The film was optioned and given a budget of $4.5million, with Guy Pearce and Carrie-Anne Moss in the starring roles. Newmarket also distributed the film after it was rejected by studios who feared that it would not attract a wide audience. Following a positive word of mouth and screenings in 500 theatres, it earned $40million. Memento premiered at the Venice International Film Festival in September 2000 to critical acclaim. Joe Morgenstern of The Wall Street Journal wrote in his review, "I can't remember when a movie has seemed so clever, strangely affecting and slyly funny at the very same time." In the book The Philosophy of Neo-Noir, Basil Smith drew a comparison with John Locke's An Essay Concerning Human Understanding, which argues that conscious memories constitute our identities – a theme Nolan explores in the film. Memento earned Nolan many accolades, including nominations for an Academy Award and a Golden Globe Award for Best Screenplay, as well as two Independent Spirit Awards: Best Director and Best Screenplay. Six critics listed it as one of the best films of the 2000s. In 2001, Nolan and Emma Thomas founded the production company Syncopy Inc.

Impressed by his work on Memento, filmmaker Steven Soderbergh recommended Nolan to Warner Bros. to direct the psychological thriller Insomnia (2002), although the studio initially wanted a more seasoned director. A remake of the 1997 Norwegian thriller of the same name, the film is viewed as "the outlier of Nolan's filmography" due to its perceived lack of unconventionality he is known for. Starring Al Pacino, Robin Williams and Hilary Swank, Insomnia follows two Los Angeles detectives sent to a northern Alaskan town to investigate the murder of a local teenager. It received positive reviews from critics and earned $113million against a budget of $46million. Film critic Roger Ebert praised the film for introducing new perspectives and ideas on the issues of morality and guilt, adding, "Unlike most remakes, the Nolan Insomnia is not a pale retread, but a re-examination of the material, like a new production of a good play." Richard Schickel of Time deemed Insomnia a "worthy successor" to Memento and "a triumph of atmosphere over a none-too-mysterious mystery". Following, Memento and Insomnia established Nolan's image as an "auteur". After the lattermost, he wrote a screenplay for a Howard Hughes biopic. Nolan reluctantly tabled his script after learning that Martin Scorsese was already making one such film: The Aviator (2004). He turned down an offer to direct the historical epic Troy (2004).

2003–2013: Widespread recognition 
In early 2003, Nolan approached Warner Bros. with the idea of making a new Batman film, based on the character's origin story. Nolan was fascinated by the notion of grounding it in a more realistic world than a comic-book fantasy. He relied heavily on traditional stunts and miniature effects during filming, with minimal use of computer-generated imagery (CGI). Batman Begins (2005), the biggest project Nolan had undertaken to that point, was released to critical acclaim and commercial success. Starring Christian Bale as Bruce Wayne / Batman—along with Michael Caine, Gary Oldman, Morgan Freeman and Liam Neeson—Batman Begins revived the franchise. Batman Begins was 2005's ninth-highest-grossing film and was praised for its psychological depth and contemporary relevance; it is cited as one of the most influential films of the 2000s. Film author Ian Nathan wrote that within five years of his career, Nolan "[went] from unknown to indie darling to gaining creative control over one of the biggest properties in Hollywood, and (perhaps unwittingly) fomenting the genre that would redefine the entire industry".

Nolan directed, co-wrote and produced The Prestige (2006), an adaptation of the Christopher Priest novel about two rival 19th-century magicians. The screenplay was the result of an intermittent, five-year collaboration between him and his brother Jonathan, who had begun writing it already in 2001. Nolan initially intended to make the film as early as 2003, but had postponed the project after agreeing to make Batman Begins. Starring Hugh Jackman and Christian Bale in the lead roles of rival magicians, The Prestige received critical acclaim and received two Academy Award nominations. Roger Ebert described it as "quite a movieatmospheric, obsessive, almost satanic", and Kenneth Turan of the Los Angeles Times called it an "ambitious, unnerving melodrama". The Guardian Philip French wrote: "In addition to the intellectual or philosophical excitement it engenders, The Prestige is gripping, suspenseful, mysterious, moving and often darkly funny." Despite a negative box-office prognosis, the film earned over $109million against a budget of $40million.

The Dark Knight (2008), the follow-up to Batman Begins, was Nolan's next venture. Initially reluctant to make a sequel, he agreed after Warner Bros. repeatedly insisted. Nolan wanted to expand on the noir quality of the first film by broadening the canvas and taking on "the dynamic of a story of the city, a large crime story... where you're looking at the police, the justice system, the vigilante, the poor people, the rich people, the criminals". Continuing to minimalise the use of CGI, Nolan employed high-resolution IMAX cameras, making it the first major motion picture to use this technology. The Dark Knight has been ranked as one of the best films of the 2000s and one of the best superhero films ever made. Many critics declare The Dark Knight to be "the most successful comic book film ever made". Manohla Dargis of The New York Times found the film to be of higher artistic merit than many Hollywood blockbusters: "Pitched at the divide between art and industry, poetry and entertainment, it goes darker and deeper than any Hollywood movie of its comic-book kind." Ebert expressed a similar point of view, describing it as a "haunted film that leaps beyond its origins and becomes an engrossing tragedy". The Dark Knight set many box-office records during its theatrical run, earning over $1billion worldwide. At the 81st Academy Awards, the film was nominated in eight categories, winning two: Best Sound Editing for Richard King and a posthumous Best Supporting Actor award for Heath Ledger. The film's failure to garner a Best Picture nomination was criticised by the media. Beginning in 2010, the Academy increased their Best Picture nominees from five to ten, a change known as "The Dark Knight Rule". Nolan received many awards and nominations for his work on the film.

The success of The Dark Knight allowed Warner Bros. to sign Nolan to write, direct and co-produce Inception (2010) – a film for which he had the idea around nine years before its release. Nolan described the film as "a contemporary sci-fi actioner set within the architecture of the mind". Starring a large ensemble cast led by Leonardo DiCaprio, the film became a critical and commercial success upon its release. Film critic Mark Kermode named it the best film of 2010, stating "Inception is proof that people are not stupid, that cinema is not trash, and that it is possible for blockbusters and art to be the same thing." Philosophy professor David Kyle Johnson wrote that "Inception became a classic almost as soon as it was projected on silver screens", praising its exploration of philosophical ideas, including leap of faith and allegory of the cave. The film grossed over $836million worldwide. Nominated for eight Academy Awards—including Best Picture and Best Original Screenplay—it won Best Cinematography, Best Sound Mixing, Best Sound Editing and Best Visual Effects. Nolan was also nominated for a BAFTA Award and a Golden Globe Award for Best Director, among other accolades.

Around the release of The Dark Knight Rises (2012), Nolan's third and final Batman film, Joseph Bevan of the British Film Institute wrote a profile on him: "In the space of just over a decade, Christopher Nolan has shot from promising British indie director to undisputed master of a new brand of intelligent escapism." After initial hesitation, Nolan agreed to return to direct The Dark Knight Rises and worked with his brother and David S. Goyer to develop a story that he felt would end the trilogy on a high note. The film was released to positive reviews; Kenneth Turan found the film "potent, persuasive and hypnotic" and "more than an exceptional superhero movie, it is masterful filmmaking by any standard". Christy Lemire of HuffPost wrote in her review that Nolan concluded his trilogy in a "typically spectacular, ambitious fashion", but disliked the "overloaded" story and excessive grimness. The Dark Knight Rises was a box office success, becoming the thirteenth film to gross $1billion. During a midnight showing of the film in Aurora, Colorado, a gunman opened fire inside the theatre, killing 12 people and injuring 58 others. Nolan released a statement expressing his condolences for the victims of what he described as a "senseless tragedy".

The Dark Knight trilogy inspired a trend in future superhero films seeking to replicate its gritty, realistic tone to little success. The second installment in particular revitalised the genre at a time when recent superhero films had failed to meet expectations. Ben Child of The Guardian wrote that the three films "will remain thrilling totems of the genre for decades to come". During story discussions for The Dark Knight Rises, Goyer told Nolan of his idea about Man of Steel (2013), which the latter would produce. Impressed with Zack Snyder's work in 300 (2006) and Watchmen (2009), Nolan hired him to direct the film. Starring Henry Cavill as Clark Kent who learns that he is a powerful alien, Man of Steel received mixed reviews and grossed more than $660million against a budget of $220million.

2014–2019: Interstellar, Dunkirk and other activities 

Nolan next directed, wrote and produced the science-fiction film Interstellar (2014). The first drafts of the script were written by Jonathan Nolan, and it was originally to be directed by Steven Spielberg. Based on the scientific theories of theoretical physicist Kip Thorne, the film follows a group of astronauts who travel through a wormhole in search of a new home for humanity. In a 2014 discussion of the film's physics, Nolan expressed his admiration for scientific objectivity, wishing it were applied "in every aspect of our civilisation". Interstellar – starring Matthew McConaughey, Anne Hathaway and Jessica Chastain – was released to positive reviews and grossed $773million worldwide. Observing its "visual dazzle, thematic ambition", The New York Times A. O. Scott wrote that Interstellar is a "sweeping, futuristic adventure driven by grief, dread and regret". Documentary filmmaker Toni Myers called the film "a real work of art" and praised it for exploring a story spanning multiple generations. Interstellar was particularly praised for its scientific accuracy, which led to the publication of two academic papers. The American Journal of Physics called for it to be shown in school science lessons. At the 87th Academy Awards, the film won Best Visual Effects and received four other nominations. Also in 2014, Nolan and Emma Thomas served as executive producers on Transcendence, the directorial debut of his longtime cinematographer Wally Pfister.

In the mid-2010s, Nolan took part in several ventures for film preservation and distribution of the work of lesser-known filmmakers. His production company, Syncopy, formed a joint venture with Zeitgeist Films to release Blu-ray editions of Zeitgeist's films. As part of the Blu-ray release of the animation films of the Brothers Quay, Nolan directed the documentary short Quay (2015). He also initiated a theatrical tour, showcasing the Quays' In Absentia, The Comb and Street of Crocodiles. IndieWire wrote that the brothers "will undoubtedly have hundreds, if not thousands more fans because of Nolan, and for that The Quay Brothers in 35mm will always be one of [the] latter's most important contributions to cinema". An advocate for the survival of the analogue medium, Nolan and visual artist Tacita Dean invited representatives from leading American film archives, laboratories and presenting institutions to participate in an informal summit entitled Reframing the Future of Film at the Getty Museum in March 2015. Subsequent events were held at Tate Modern in London, Museo Tamayo in Mexico City and Tata Theatre in Mumbai. In April 2015, Nolan joined the board of directors of The Film Foundation, a non-profitable organisation dedicated to film preservation, and was appointed, along with Martin Scorsese, by the Library of Congress to serve on the National Film Preservation Board as DGA representatives. Nolan also serves on the Motion Picture & Television Fund Board of Governors.

After serving as an executive producer on Zack Snyder's Batman v Superman: Dawn of Justice (2016) and Justice League (2017), Nolan returned to directing with Dunkirk (2017). Based on his own original screenplay and co-produced with Thomas, the film is set amid World War II in 1940 and the evacuation of Allied soldiers from the beaches of Dunkirk, France. Describing the film as a survival tale with a triptych structure, Nolan wanted to make a "sensory, almost experimental movie" with minimal dialogue. He said he waited to make Dunkirk until he had earned the trust of a major studio to let him make it as a British film but with an American budget. Before filming, Nolan sought advice from Spielberg, who later said in an interview with Variety, "knowing and respecting that Chris [Nolan] is one of the world's most imaginative filmmakers, my advice to him was to leave his imagination, as I did on Ryan, in second position to the research he was doing to authentically acquit this historical drama". Starring an ensemble cast, Dunkirk was released to widespread critical acclaim and strong box office results. It grossed over $526million worldwide, making it the highest-grossing World WarII film of all time. In his review, Mick LaSalle of the San Francisco Chronicle wrote: "It's one of the best war films ever made, distinct in its look, in its approach and in the effect it has on viewers. There are movies—they are rare—that lift you out of your present circumstances and immerse you so fully in another experience that you watch in a state of jaw-dropped awe. Dunkirk is that kind of movie." The film received many accolades, including Nolan's first Oscar nomination for Best Director.

In 2018, Nolan supervised a new 70mm print of Stanley Kubrick's 2001: A Space Odyssey (1968), made from the original camera negative; he presented it at the 2018 Cannes Film Festival. USA Today observed that festival-goers greeted the director "like a rock star with a standing ovation". A year later, Nolan and Thomas received executive producer credits on The Doll's Breath (2019), an animated short directed by the Quay brothers.

2020–present: Tenet and Oppenheimer 
The science fiction film Tenet (2020) – described by Tom Shone of The Sunday Times as "a globe-spinning riff on all things Nolanesque" – was his next directorial effort. Nolan had worked on the screenplay for more than five years after deliberating about its central ideas for over a decade. Delayed three times due to the COVID-19 pandemic, Tenet was the first Hollywood tent-pole to open in theatres after the pandemic shutdown. The film tells the story of an unnamed protagonist (played by John David Washington) who travels through time to stop a world-threatening attack. It grossed $363million worldwide against a production budget of $200million, becoming Nolan's first to underperform at the box-office. Tenet was described as the most polarising effort of his career; critics praised the direction but found its story confusing. Peter Bradshaw of The Guardian awarded the film a full five stars, calling it "a cerebral cadenza, a deadpan flourish of crazy implausibility—but supercharged with steroidal energy and imagination". Leslie Felperin of The Hollywood Reporter described it as "a chilly, cerebral film—easy to admire, especially since it's so rich in audacity and originality, but almost impossible to love, lacking as it is in a certain humanity". At the 93rd Academy Awards, the film won Best Visual Effects and was nominated for Best Production Design. Following the release of Tenet, Nolan joined the Advisory Board of the Society of Motion Picture and Television Engineers. He served as an executive producer on Zack Snyder's Justice League (2021), a director's cut of 2017's Justice League.

Nolan's twelfth directorial venture will be Oppenheimer (2023), a biopic based on J. Robert Oppenheimer (played by Cillian Murphy) and his role in the development of the atom bomb. The film will be financed and distributed by Universal Pictures, making it Nolan's first since Memento that was not made for Warner Bros. He was disillusioned with the latter's decision to simultaneously release their films in theatres and on HBO Max. Nolan secured the deal with Universal after he was promised a production budget of around $100 million with an equal marketing budget, total creative control, 20 per cent of first-dollar gross, a 100-day theatrical window and a blackout period from the studio wherein the company would not release another film three weeks before or after Oppenheimer release.

Personal life and image 

Nolan is married to Emma Thomas, whom he met at University College London when he was 19. She has worked as a producer on all of his films since 1997. The couple have four children and reside in Los Angeles.

Rarely granting promotional interviews about his films, Nolan prefers to maintain a certain level of mystery about his work. Refusing to discuss his personal life, he feels that too much biographical information about a filmmaker detracts from the experience of his audiences. "I actually don't want people to have me in mind at all when they're watching the films." Author Stuart Joy felt that Nolan's unwillingness to talk about his personal life shows a desire for control, one of the recurring themes in his work. 

Nolan was physically assaulted by fellow filmmaker David O. Russell in 2003 at a party in Hollywood. The latter reportedly put Nolan in a headlock and wrapped his arm around Nolan's neck.

Filmmaking style

Nolan's films are majorly centred in metaphysical themes, exploring the concepts of time, memory and personal identity. His work is characterised by mathematically inspired ideas and images, unconventional narrative structures, materialistic perspectives, and evocative use of music and sound. Filmmaker Guillermo del Toro called Nolan "an emotional mathematician". BBC's arts editor Will Gompertz described him as "an art house auteur making intellectually ambitious blockbuster movies that can leave your pulse racing and your head spinning". Joseph Bevan wrote, "His films allow arthouse regulars to enjoy superhero flicks and multiplex crowds to engage with labyrinthine plot conceits." Nolan views himself as "an indie filmmaker working inside the studio system".

In the sixteen-essay book The Philosophy of Christopher Nolan, professional philosophers and writers analysed Nolan's work; they identified themes of self-destruction, the nature and value of the truth, and the political mindset of the hero and villain, among others. Robbie B. H. Goh, a professor of English literature, described Nolan as a "philosophical filmmaker" who includes philosophical ideas—existentialism, morality, epistemology and the distinction between appearance and reality—in films that frequently portray suspense, action and violence. Goh appreciated his ability to incorporate such themes in films that possess "elements of the Hollywood blockbuster"—which help keep the audiences engaged—but simultaneously remain "more thoughtful and self-reflexive than the typical consumerist action film". He further wrote that Nolan's body of work reflect "a heterogeneity of conditions of products" extending from low-budget films to lucrative blockbusters, "a wide range of genres and settings" and "a diversity of styles that trumpet his versatility".

David Bordwell, a film theorist, opined that Nolan has been able to blend his "experimental impulses" with the demands of mainstream entertainment, describing his oeuvre as "experiments with cinematic time by means of techniques of subjective viewpoint and crosscutting". Nolan's use of practical, in-camera effects, miniatures and models, as well as shooting on celluloid film, has been highly influential in early 21st century cinema. IndieWire wrote in 2019 that the director "kept a viable alternate model of big-budget filmmaking alive" in an era where blockbuster filmmaking has become "a largely computer-generated art form". Because of Nolan's deep involvement in the technical facet of his films, Stuart Joy described him as a "complete filmmaker" who "oversees all aspects of production while also managing cultural and industrial factors outside of the text".

Recognition 
Nolan has made some of the most influential and popular films of his time. Many of his films have been regarded by critics as among the best of their respective decades, and according to The Wall Street Journal, his "ability to combine box-office success with artistic ambition has given him an extraordinary amount of clout in the industry". His films have earned $5billion. Nolan's films Memento and The Dark Knight have been selected by the US Library of Congress to be preserved in the National Film Registry for being "culturally, historically or aesthetically" significant. These films and Inception appeared in BBC's 100 Greatest Films of the 21st Century and The Hollywood Reporter poll of best films ever made. In 2017, The Dark Knight, Inception and Interstellar featured in Empire magazine's poll of "The 100 Greatest Movies". In 2018, The Hollywood Reporter listed Nolan as one of the 100 most powerful people in entertainment and described him as a "franchise unto himself". Parade ranked Nolan number eight in its 2022 list of 75 Best Movie Directors of All Time.

Nolan's work has been as "intensely embraced, analysed and debated by ordinary film fans as by critics and film academics". Calling him "a persuasively inventive storyteller", Geoff Andrew of the British Film Institute named Nolan one of the few contemporary filmmakers producing highly personal films within the Hollywood mainstream. Andrew wrote that Nolan's films are "not so much [notable] for their considerable technical virtuosity and visual flair as for their brilliant narrative ingenuity and their unusually adult interest in complex philosophical questions". David Bordwell observed that Nolan is "considered one of the most accomplished living filmmakers", citing his ability to turn genre movies into both art and event films, as well as his box office numbers, critical acclaim and popularity among cinemagoers. In 2008, Philip French deemed Nolan "the first major talent to emerge this [21st] century". Mark Kermode complimented Nolan for bringing "the discipline and ethics of art-house independent moviemaking and apply[ing] them to Hollywood blockbusters. He's living proof that you don't have to appeal to the lowest common denominator to be profitable". The Observer Ryan Gilbey described Nolan as a "skillful, stylish storyteller, capable of combining the spectacle of Spielberg with the intellectual intricacy of Nicolas Roeg or Alain Resnais". Mark Cousins applauded Nolan for embracing big ideas, "Hollywood filmmakers generally shy away from ideas—but not Christopher Nolan". Scott Foundas of Variety declared Nolan "the premier big-canvas storyteller of his generation", and Justin Chang of the Los Angeles Times called him "the great proceduralist of 21st century blockbuster filmmaking, a lover of nuts-and-bolts minutiae".

Nolan has been praised by many of his contemporaries, and his work has influenced them. Kenneth Branagh called Nolan's approach to large-scale filmmaking "unique in modern cinema", adding, "regardless of how popular his movies become, he remains an artist and an auteur. I think for that reason he has become a heroic figure for both the audience and the people working behind the camera." Michael Mann complimented Nolan for his "singular vision" and credited with "invent[ing] the post-heroic superhero". Nicolas Roeg said of Nolan, "People talk about 'commercial art' and the term is usually self-negating; Nolan works in the commercial arena and yet there's something very poetic about his work." Martin Scorsese identified Nolan as a filmmaker creating "beautifully made films on a big scale".

Damien Chazelle lauded Nolan for his ability "to make the most seemingly impersonal projects—superhero epics, deep-space mind-benders—feel deeply personal". Discussing the difference between art films and big studio blockbusters, Steven Spielberg referred to Nolan's Dark Knight series as an example of both; he has described Memento and Inception as "masterworks". Denis Villeneuve was impressed by Nolan's ability "to keep his identity and create his own universe in that large scope... To bring intellectual concepts and to bring them in that scope to the screen right now—it's very rare. Every movie that he comes out with, I have more admiration for his work." James Cameron expressed disappointment that Nolan was not nominated for an Academy Award as Best Director for Inception, calling it "the most astounding piece of film creation and direction of the year, hands down".

Filmography 

Following (1998)
Memento (2000)
Insomnia (2002)
Batman Begins (2005)
The Prestige (2006)
The Dark Knight (2008)
Inception (2010)
The Dark Knight Rises (2012)
Interstellar (2014)
Dunkirk (2017)
Tenet (2020)
Oppenheimer (2023)

Awards and honours 

Nolan has been nominated for five Academy Awards, five British Academy Film Awards and six Golden Globe Awards. Nolan was named an Honorary Fellow of UCL in 2006, and conferred an honorary doctorate in literature in 2017. From 2011 to 2014, he appeared in Forbes Celebrity 100 list based on his income and popularity. In 2012, he became the youngest director to receive a hand-and-footprint ceremony at Grauman's Chinese Theatre in Los Angeles. Nolan appeared in Time 100 most influential people in the world in 2015. He was appointed Commander of the Order of the British Empire in the 2019 New Year Honours for services to film.

Notes

References

Cited sources

Further reading

External links 

 
 
 
 Christopher Nolan Biography at Tribute.ca
 Christopher Nolan – How to Direct Your First Feature Film

 
1970 births
Living people
20th-century English writers
20th-century American writers
20th-century American male writers
21st-century English writers
21st-century American writers
21st-century American male writers
Action film directors
Alumni of University College London
American cinematographers
American film editors
American film producers
American film production company founders
American male screenwriters
American people of English descent
Best Director AACTA International Award winners
British film production company founders
Commanders of the Order of the British Empire
David di Donatello winners
Edgar Award winners
English cinematographers
English film editors
English film producers
English male screenwriters
English people of American descent
Film directors from Illinois
Film directors from London
Film directors from Los Angeles
Film producers from California
Film producers from London
Hugo Award-winning writers
Independent Spirit Award for Best Director winners
Nebula Award winners
People educated at Haileybury and Imperial Service College
People from Westminster
Postmodernist filmmakers
Science fiction film directors
Screenwriters from California
Screenwriters from Illinois
Sundance Film Festival award winners
Writers from Chicago
Writers from Evanston, Illinois
Writers from London
Writers from Los Angeles
Writers Guild of America Award winners